Álvaro Jofré Cáceres (born 1971) is a Chilean school teacher who was elected as a member of the Chilean Constitutional Convention.

References

External links
 Profile at Chile Constituyente

Living people
1971 births
Chilean journalists
21st-century Chilean politicians
National Renewal (Chile) politicians
Members of the Chilean Constitutional Convention